Dar El Beïda is a district in Algiers Province, Algeria. It was named after its capital, Dar El Beïda.

Municipalities
The district is further divided into 7 municipalities, which is the highest number in the province:
Dar El Beïda
Bab Ezzouar
Aïn Taya
El Marsa
Bordj El Bahri
Bordj El Kiffan
Mohammedia

Transport
The district is served by the Algiers tramway which runs from the town to Bordj el Kiffan, including:
 Yahia Boushaki tram stop

Notable people

Districts of Algiers Province